Demobotys is a genus of moths of the family Crambidae.

Species
Demobotys monoceralis Munroe & Mutuura, 1969
Demobotys pervulgalis (Hampson, 1913)

References

Pyraustinae
Crambidae genera
Taxa named by Eugene G. Munroe